Edward Edwards is an American film and television actor.

Edwards attended and graduated at Sunset High School in Dallas, Texas. He had minor roles in over fifty different television shows since his acting debut in 1974, in shows such as The Dukes of Hazzard,The Ropers,Family Ties, ALF, Fresh Prince Of Bel Air, House, Desperate Housewives, 24, Commander in Chief, Boston Legal, Without a Trace, CSI: Crime Scene Investigation, NYPD Blue, Monk, Criminal Minds, Frasier and JAG.

Edwards has also appeared in minor roles in films such as Gang Related (1997), Bounce (2000) and Duplex (2003).

Filmography

See also
List of people with reduplicated names

References

External links

American male film actors
American male television actors
20th-century American male actors
21st-century American male actors
Living people
Place of birth missing (living people)
Year of birth missing (living people)